Baoris farri, commonly known as the paintbrush swift, is a species of butterfly belonging to the family Hesperiidae. It is found in India.

Description

Larvae are known to breed on Ochlandra travancorica, Ochlandra scriptoria, Bambusa striata and Bambusa wamin.

References

Hesperiinae
Butterflies of Asia
Butterflies of Singapore
Butterflies of Indochina